is a railway station in Miyazaki City, Miyazaki Prefecture, Japan.

Lines

Layout 
The station, which is unstaffed, consists of an island platform serving two tracks at grade with two sidings beyond platform/track 2. There is no station building but an enclosed waiting room housing an automatic ticket vending machine has been set up under the canopy of the island platform. A red torii stands at the station entrance, recalling the nearby Miyazaki-jingū shrine. Access to the island platform from the station entrance is by means of a level crossing with a ramp.

Adjacent stations

History
On 15 December 1913, the  opened a line from  northwards to Hirose (now closed). This station, then named  was opened on the same day as an intermediate station on the track. Expanding north of Takanabe in phases, the track eventually reached  and the entire stretch from Kokura to Miyakonojō was redesignated as the Nippō Main Line on 15 December 1923. Hanagajima was renamed Miyazaki-Jingu on 10 November 1954. With the privatization of Japanese National Railways (JNR), the successor of JGR, on 1 April 1987, the station came under the control of JR Kyushu.

Passenger statistics
In fiscal 2016, the station was used by an average of 542 passengers daily (boarding passengers only), and it ranked 235th among the busiest stations of JR Kyushu.

Environs
Miyazaki-jingū

See also
List of railway stations in Japan

References

External links
Miyazaki-Jingū (JR Kyushu)

Railway stations in Miyazaki Prefecture
Railway stations in Japan opened in 1913